Sayran (Saıran) is a station on Line 1 of the Almaty Metro. The station is located between Alatau and Moskva. It was opened on 18 April 2015 as a part of the second stretch of Line 1 between Alatau and Moskva.

The station is located west of the city center, at the intersection between Abay Avenue and Brusilovsky Street. It is built underground and has one island platform.

The Sayran Bus Terminal (Автовокзал Сайран) is at Sadovnikov Street and Tole Bi Street, 9 minutes away by car on the other side of the lake from the subway station.

References 

Almaty Metro stations
Railway stations opened in 2015
2015 establishments in Kazakhstan